"People Hold On" is a song by British band Coldcut and singer-songwriter Lisa Stansfield, released as the first single from the band's debut album, What's That Noise? (1989). It was written by Matt Black, Jonathan More and Stansfield, and produced by Coldcut. The song received positive reviews from music critics and became a commercial success. It was released as a single on 13 March 1989 and reached number eleven on the UK Singles Chart and number six on the US Billboards Hot Dance Club Songs chart. The song was remixed by Blaze, Juan Atkins, Dimitri from Paris, Mark Saunders, Eric Kupper, Tyrone Perkins and Masters At Work. 

In 2003, "People Hold On" was included on Stansfield's compilation, Biography: The Greatest Hits. In 2006, Casuals Remix by Ceri Evans was included on Coldcut's album, Sound Mirrors (Videos & Remixes). In 2014, Full Length Disco Mix of "People Hold On" was included on Stansfield's People Hold On ... The Remix Anthology (also on The Collection 1989–2003).

Chart performance
"People Hold On" managed to make some impact on the charts in several countries. It peaked within the top 20 in the UK, where it made it to number eleven on 9 April 1989, in its fourth week at the UK Singles Chart. Additionally, the song was a top 30 hit in West Germany (24), a top 40 hit in Belgium (32) and the Netherlands (37), and a top 50 hit in France (45). On the Eurochart Hot 100, "People Hold On" reached its best position as number 26 in April 1989. Outside Europe, it peaked at number six on the US Billboard Dance Club Songs chart, while reaching number 37 in New Zealand and number 78 in Australia.

Critical reception
In an retrospective review, Matthew Hocter from Albumism described "People Hold On" as "an innovative dance track". Greg Kot from Chicago Tribune noted Stansfield's "elastic" voice. Tom Ewing of Freaky Trigger complimented her "as a house vocalist". He added, "Lisa Stansfield was a terrific find: she could play the belter with the best of them, but also provide a calm centre for Coldcut’s gleeful cut-and-mix pyrotechnics and pianos. Best of all, she sounded like she was having a tremendous time." A reviewer from Music & Media said, "An effective mixture of Stansfield's soul voice and a rare groove/house backing. Great dance track with a strong melody." Jerry Smith from Music Week declared it as "unforgettable". David Quantick from NME wrote, "Their 'People Hold On' is one of the best things done by either Coldcut or Stansfield, a chargingly daft love 'n' peace nonsense anthem that was really a call for drug-addled copulation. Most importantly for Stansfield, it emphasised a '70s soul stance that suited her voice." Edward Hill from The Plain Dealer praised the song as "fabulous". Marisa Fox from Spin complimented it as a "catchy hit". Joe Brown from The Washington Post described it as "propulsive".

Music video
A music video was produced to promote the single, directed by Big TV!. It was later published on Stansfield's official YouTube channel in March 2012, and had generated more than 1.1 million views as of April 2022.

Impact and legacy
British music publication Fact ranked "People Hold On" number 11 in their list of "21 Diva-House Belters That Still Sound Incredible" in 2014, writing,

Electronic dance and clubbing magazine Mixmag ranked it as one of the 20 best songs in their "The 20 Best Diva House Tracks" list in 2019, adding,

Track listings

 Australian/European 7" single
"People Hold On" – 3:58
"Yes, Yes, Yes" – 3:33

 Australian/European CD single
"People Hold On" – 3:58
"People Hold On" (Full Length Disco Mix) – 9:24
"Yes, Yes, Yes" – 5:40

 Australian/European 12" single
"People Hold On" (Full Length Disco Mix) – 9:24
"Yes, Yes, Yes" (Hedmaster Mix) – 5:40

 European 12" single (The Blaze Mix)
"People Hold On" (New Jersey Jazz Mix) – 8:49
"People Hold On" (Speng Mix) – 6:34
"People Hold On" (A Capella) – 2:08
"Yes, Yes, Yes" – 5:40

 European promotional 12" single
"People Hold On" (Full Length Disco Mix) – 9:24
"People Hold On" (Magic Juan's Dub Mix) 
"People Hold On" (A Capella) – 2:08

 European promotional 12" single
"People Hold On" (New Jersey Jazz Mix) – 8:49
"People Hold On" (Dimitri Remix) – 6:45

 US 12" single
"People Hold On" (Full Length Disco Mix) – 9:24
"People Hold On" (Speng Mix) – 6:34
"People Hold On" (Radio Mix) – 3:58
"People Hold On" (New Jersey Jazz Mix) – 8:49
"People Hold On" (A Capella) – 2:08

 US 12" single (Limited Edition)
"People Hold On" (NYC Club Mix) – 7:58
"People Hold On" (Dirty Piano Mix) – 5:33
"People Hold On" (Perk-Appella Mix) – 6:21
"People Hold On" (Radio Mix) – 3:58
"People Hold On" (NYC Club Edit) – 4:33
"People Hold On" (R.E.T.T. Dub) – 8:07

 US 12" single (Masters At Work Mixes)
"People Hold On" (MAW Mix 1)
"People Hold On" (MAW Mix 2)
"People Hold On" (MAW Mix 3)
"People Hold On" (MAW Mix 4)

 2006 UK 12" promotional single
"People Hold On" (Casuals Remix) – 4:32
"People Hold On" (Ricey Remix) – 5:57

Charts

"People Hold On" (The Bootleg Mixes)

In 1996, "People Hold On" was remixed by British producers Dan Bewick and Matt Frost as the Dirty Rotten Scoundrels. The CD single with these Bootleg Mixes was released on 6 January 1997 and charted higher than the original version of the song in 1989, peaking at number four on the UK Singles Chart and topping the UK Dance Singles Chart as well as the US Billboard Hot Dance Club Songs chart. The Dirty Rotten Scoundrels took their cue from Armand Van Helden's radical reworking of Tori Amos' "Professional Widow", which topped the UK chart the week that the bootleg mixes debuted.

Because of this success, "People Hold On" (Bootleg Mix) was included on Stansfield's eponymous album (1997) as a bonus track. The music video, directed by Max Abbiss-Biro, does not include any new footage of Stansfield but uses small fragments taken from "Change" and "Someday (I'm Coming Back)" videos. Later, "People Hold On" (Dirty Rotten Scoundrels Mix) was also featured on The Remix Album (1998) and a limited edition of Biography: The Greatest Hits (2003). On 24 October 2006, Dance Vault Mixes of "People Hold On" were released digitally. In 2014, Jon Is the Don Mix of "People Hold On" was included on the deluxe 2CD + DVD re-release of Lisa Stansfield (also on The Collection 1989–2003).

Critical reception
Scottish Aberdeen Press and Journal wrote, "This bootleg is only going to be available for one week at the start of the New Year and can be expected to do big things. Bearing an uncanny resemblance to Armand Van Helden’s remix of Tori Amos’ excellent Professional Widow, except featuring vocals from Lisa's classic". The newspaper added that "the rush to get a copy will probably see it in the Top Ten. Not bad at all, even if a tad unoriginal."

Track listings

 European CD single
 "People Hold On" (Dirty Radio Mix) – 3:42 
 "People Hold On" (Jon Is the Don Mix) – 8:09

 Australian and European CD maxi-single
 "People Hold On" (Dirty Radio Mix) – 3:42 
 "People Hold On" (Original 7" Version) – 3:58
 "People Hold On" (Jon Is the Don Mix) – 8:09
 "People Hold On" (Monjack Dub) – 7:59
 "People Hold On" (Full Length Disco Mix) – 9:21

 European 12-inch single
 "People Hold On" (Jon Is the Don Mix) – 8:09
 "People Hold On" (Original 7" Version) – 3:58
 "People Hold On" (Monjack Dub) – 7:59
 "People Hold On" (Full Length Disco Mix) – 9:21

 2006 US digital Dance Vault mixes
 "People Hold On" (Dirty Radio Mix) – 3:42 
 "People Hold On" (Original 7" Version) – 3:58
 "People Hold On" (Jon Is the Don Mix) – 8:09
 "People Hold On" (Monjack Dub) – 7:59
 "People Hold On" (Full Length Disco Mix) – 9:21

Charts

Weekly charts

Year-end charts

See also
List of number-one dance singles of 1997 (U.S.)

References

1989 singles
1997 singles
1989 songs
Arista Records singles
Acid house songs
Coldcut songs
House music songs
Lisa Stansfield songs
Music videos directed by Big T.V.
Songs written by Lisa Stansfield